The Wolf Man is the title of several horror film series centered on Larry Talbot, a man who upon being bitten by a werewolf becomes one himself, and his subsequent attempts to cure himself of his murderous condition. The franchise was created by Curt Siodmak.

Universal Classic Monsters film series (1941–1948)
The original series of films consisted of seven installments, all of which starred iconic horror actor Lon Chaney Jr. as Larry Talbot. The series of films is part of the larger Universal Classic Monsters series.

 The Wolf Man (1941)   When his brother dies, Larry Talbot (Lon Chaney Jr.) returns to Wales and reconciles with his father (Claude Rains). While there, he visits an antique shop and, hoping to impress Gwen (Evelyn Ankers), the attractive shopkeeper, buys a silver walking cane. That same night he kills a wolf with it, only to later learn that he actually killed a man (Bela Lugosi). A gypsy (Maria Ouspenskaya) explains that it was her son, a werewolf, that he killed, and that Larry is now one himself.
 Frankenstein Meets the Wolf Man (1943)   Lawrence Stewart Talbot (Lon Chaney Jr.) is plagued by a physical oddity that turns him into a crazed werewolf after sundown. His desire to rid himself of this ailment leads him to the castle owned by mad scientist Dr. Frankenstein. Frankenstein, it turns out, is now dead, yet Talbot believes that the scientist's daughter, Baroness Elsa Frankenstein (Ilona Massey), can help him. However, his quest to right himself puts him on a collision course with Frankenstein's monster (Bela Lugosi).
 House of Frankenstein (1944)   After escaping from prison, the evil Dr. Niemann (Boris Karloff) and his hunchbacked assistant, Daniel (J. Carrol Naish), plot their revenge against those who imprisoned them. For this, they recruit the powerful Wolf Man (Lon Chaney Jr.), Frankenstein's monster (Glenn Strange) and even Dracula himself (John Carradine). Niemann pursues those who wrong him, sending each monster out to do his dirty work. But his control on the monsters is weak at best and may prove to be his downfall.
 House of Dracula (1945)   This monster movie focuses on the iconic vampire, Count Dracula (John Carradine), and Lawrence Talbot (Lon Chaney), better known as the Wolf Man. Both beings of the night are tired of their supernatural afflictions, so they seek out Dr. Franz Edelmann (Onslow Stevens) for cures for their respective curses. While trying to aid the imposing creatures, Edelmann himself develops a transformative condition, adding to the many ghouls lurking around the foreboding landscape.
 Abbott and Costello Meet Frankenstein (1948)   In the first of Bud Abbott and Lou Costello's horror vehicles for Universal Pictures, the inimitable comic duo star as railway baggage handlers in northern Florida. When a pair of crates belonging to a house of horrors museum are mishandled by Wilbur (Lou Costello), the museum's director, Mr. MacDougal (Frank Ferguson), demands that they deliver them personally so that they can be inspected for insurance purposes, but Lou's friend Chick (Bud Abbott) has grave suspicions, after receiving a phone call from Lawrence Talbot (Lon Chaney Jr.) warning him of their contents (Bela Lugosi and Glenn Strange).

Further crossovers, remake and reboots (1950s–present)

In March 2006, Universal Pictures announced the remake of The Wolf Man with Puerto Rican actor Benicio del Toro, a huge fan of the original and collector of Wolf Man memorabilia, in the lead role, who was "cast for his resemblance to Lon Chaney, Jr., with his clouded, thick features and his air of suffering". Lawrence is depicted as an "Anglo-Indian, which explains his complexion, and the film notes that he was educated in America, to explain his accent". Screenwriter Andrew Kevin Walker was attached to the screenplay, developing the original film's story to include additional characters as well as plot points that would take advantage of modern visual effects. Del Toro also looked towards Werewolf of London and The Curse of the Werewolf for inspiration.

In February 2007, director Mark Romanek was attached to helm The Wolfman. Romanek's original vision was to "infuse a balance of cinema in a popcorn movie scenario": "When there’s a certain amount of money involved, these things make studios and producers a little nervous. They don’t necessarily understand it or they feel that the balance will swing too far to something esoteric, and we could never come to an agreement on the right balance for that type of thing. Ultimately it made more sense for them to find a director that was gonna fulfill their idea of the film that they wanted, and we just sort of parted ways".

In January 2008, Romanek left the project because of creative differences. Brett Ratner emerged as a frontrunner to replace Romanek, but the studio also met with Frank Darabont, James Mangold and Joe Johnston. They were also interested in Bill Condon, and Martin Campbell was interested. Johnston was hired to direct on in February, and the film's shooting schedule and budget remained as intended. Johnston hired David Self to rewrite the script.

 Van Helsing (2004)   Famed monster slayer Gabriel Van Helsing (Hugh Jackman) is dispatched to Transylvania to assist the last of the Valerious bloodline in defeating Count Dracula (Richard Roxburgh). Anna Valerious (Kate Beckinsale) reveals that Dracula has formed an unholy alliance with Dr. Frankenstein's monster (Shuler Hensley) and is hell-bent on exacting a centuries-old curse on her family. Together Anna and Van Helsing set out to destroy their common enemy, but uncover some unsettling secrets along the way.
 The Wolfman (2010)   Though absent from his ancestral home of Blackmoor for many years, aristocrat Lawrence Talbot (Benicio Del Toro) returns to find his missing brother at the request of the latter's fiancée, Gwen (Emily Blunt). He learns that a creature has links to an ancient curse turning people into werewolves when the moon is full. To save the village and protect Gwen, he must slay the bloodthirsty beast, but he contends with a horrifying family legacy.

In 2000, animated horror musical comedy film Alvin and the Chipmunks Meet the Wolfman was released, while in 2009, House of the Wolf Man was released, starring Ron Chaney, the grandson of Lon Chaney, Jr. Universal's 2012 film Werewolf: The Beast Among Us was originally planned as a spin-off from the film but was ultimately unrelated. Universal announced that it would reboot their Universal Monsters properties as part of a shared cinematic universe, with Alex Kurtzman and Chris Morgan attached to develop the structure of the shared universe. In November 2014, Universal hired Aaron Guzikowski to write the shared universe's reboot of The Wolf Man. In June 2016, Dwayne Johnson was reported to star as the character. In October, David Callaham was brought on board to re-write the script. In October 2021, Deadline reported that Derek Cianfrance will direct the reboot.

 Alvin and the Chipmunks Meet the Wolfman (2000)   In this animated adventure, chipmunk Alvin (Ross Bagdasarian Jr.) has werewolves on his mind. After being haunted by a creepy nightmare, he is convinced that his eerie next-door neighbor, Mr. Talbot (Maurice LaMarche), has a monstrous secret. As he and his brother Simon (also Bagdasarian) investigate, shy sibling Theodore (Janice Karman), who has been reluctantly cast in the school's production of Dr. Jekyll and Mr. Hyde, finds his inner monster after being attacked by a strange dog.
 House of the Wolf Man (2009)  Dr. Bela Reinhardt (Ron Chaney) is a mad doctor who has invited five people to his castle to determine which of them shall inherit his estate. He has arranged for a competition of sorts. The winner will be chosen by process of elimination. The visitors quickly realize they have made a terrible mistake in accepting Reinhardt's invitation, but are trapped like rats in a cage under the watchful eye of Reinhardt's ghoulish manservant, Barlow (John McGarr). They soon discover the castle is full of terrifying monsters such as the Wolf Man (Billy Bussey), Frankenstein's monster (Craig Dabbs), and Dracula (Michael R. Thomas).

Feature films

Cast and characters

 A dark grey cell indicates the character was not in the film.
 A  indicates the character was shown in a photograph and/or mentioned.
 A  indicates a uncredited role.
 A  indicates a voice-only role.
 A  indicates a cameo appearance.
 A  indicates an appearance wherein an actor's facial features were digitally imprinted upon another actor's face.
 A  indicates an appearance as a younger version of a pre-existing character.
 An  indicates an appearance through archival footage, audio or stills.

Crew

Reception

Sequel novel series
 In Jeff Rovin's 1998 novel Return of the Wolf Man it is revealed Talbot and Dracula had survived the fall they took at the end of Abbott and Costello Meet Frankenstein. Talbot subsequently kills Charles Stevens and, upon reverting to human form, has Joan Raymond kill him and perform a specific burial so Talbot could never be revived. Talbot is inadvertently revived and befriends Raymond's niece Caroline Cooke, and Talbot turns his attention from being killed once and for all to stopping the also returning Dracula and Frankenstein's monster. In the end, Talbot, in his werewolf form, kills Dracula only to be beaten to death by Caroline with a silver candelabrum.
 In Frank Dello Stritto's 2017 novel A Werewolf Remembers – The Testament of Lawrence Stewart Talbot, Talbot's diaries are discovered in a storage room in La Mirada, Florida (where Talbot was last seen in Abbott and Costello Meet Frankenstein). In the diaries, Talbot tells of his youth, his years of exile in America, the adventures recounted in his Universal films, and the return of his curse after his cure by Dr. Edelmann (in House of Dracula).

See also 

 Universal Classic Monsters
 Dracula (Universal film series)
 Frankenstein (Universal film series)
 The Invisible Man (film series)
 The Mummy (franchise)

References

Film series introduced in 1941
Horror film franchises
Universal Pictures franchises
American black-and-white films
Horror mass media franchises
Universal Monsters film series
American werewolf films
Werewolf fiction